Emily Bratti (born June 11, 2002) is an American ice dancer. With her skating partner, Ian Somerville, she competed in the final segment at the 2022 Four Continents Championships.

Personal life 
Bratti was born on June 11, 2002, in Georgetown, Washington, D.C. to Virginia and Michael Bratti. She has an younger brother named Peter. Bratti graduated from Georgetown Visitation Preparatory School in 2020 and is a student at the University of Michigan as of 2022. She was previously a competitive diver.

Career

Early career 
Bratti began skating in 2007. She competed one season in 2019–20 with Mathieu Couyras for France, including at two Junior Grand Prix events.

2021–22 season 
In the summer of 2021, Bratti teamed up with Ian Somerville, who she had known for three years while he trained at the same facility with a different partner. They moved to train with Charlie White and Greg Zuerlein at the newly opened Michigan Ice Dance Academy in Canton, Michigan.

Bratti/Somerville made their international debut on the Challenger series at the 2021 CS Cup of Austria, finishing eighth. They went on to place fifth at the 2021 CS Golden Spin of Zagreb. At their senior national debut at the 2022 U.S. Championships, Bratti/Somerville were fifth. This placement earned them an assignment to the 2022 Four Continents Championships in Tallinn, where they also finished fifth. Somerville said he looked forward to the off-season and having more time to improve the partnership.

2022–23 season 
Bratti and Somerville's summer training was disrupted in June after a fall in a lift resulted in Bratti fracturing a bone in her face and requiring three root canal surgeries to repair damage to her teeth. Eventually they resumed training, though they did not attempt lifts again for over a month afterward.

Bratti/Somerville began the season at the Lake Placid Ice Dance International, coming in fourth. They were fourth as well at the 2022 CS Lombardia Trophy. Invited to make their Grand Prix debut at the 2022 Skate Canada International, the team finished in sixth place. They won the gold medal at the 2022 CS Ice Challenge, their first Challenger title.

Finishing the season at the 2023 U.S. Championships, Bratti/Somerville placed fifth for the second consecutive year.

Programs

With Somerville

With Couyras

Competitive highlights 
GP: Grand Prix; CS: Challenger Series; JGP: Junior Grand Prix; USCS: U.S. Figure Skating Championship Series

With Somerville for the United States

With Couyras for France

With Wang for the United States

References

External links 
 
 Emily BRATTI / Ian SOMERVILLE at U.S. Figure Skating
 
 

2002 births
Living people
American female ice dancers
French female ice dancers
Figure skaters from Washington, D.C.
Georgetown Visitation Preparatory School alumni